Jin Jin may refer to:

Jin Jin (musician), British musician
Jinjin (born 1996), South Korean musician

See also
Jin Jin and the Panda Patrol, 1994 TV series
Jin Jing (born 1981), Chinese fencer